Hubbardiidae is a family of arachnids, superficially resembling spiders. It is the larger of the two extant families of the order, Schizomida, and is divided into two subfamilies. The family is based on the description published by Orator F. Cook in 1899, and was previously named as Schizomidae. The American Arachnological Society assigns the common name hubbardiid shorttailed whipscorpion to members of this family

The subfamily of Megaschizominae contains only one genus endemic to Southern Africa, while the rest belong to the subfamily Hubbardiinae. Seven of these genera are found in Australia (of which five are endemic): Draculoides, Julattenius, Notozomus, Attenuizomus and Brignolizomus. Five genera are found in Mexico, three of which are endemic (Pacal, Mayazomus and Sotanostenochrus).

Genera
, the World Schizomida Catalog accepts the following seventy-six genera:

Adisomus Cokendolpher & Reddell, 2000
Afrozomus Reddell & Cokendolpher, 1995
Ambulantactus Monjaraz-Ruedas, Prendini & Francke, 2019
Anepsiozomus Harvey, 2001
Antillostenochrus Armas & Teruel, 2002
Apozomus Harvey, 1992
Artacarus Cook, 1899
Attenuizomus Harvey, 2000
Baalrog Monjaraz-Ruedas, Prendini & Francke, 2019
Bamazomus Harvey, 1992
Belicenochrus Armas & Víquez, 2010
Brignolizomus Harvey, 2000
Bucinozomus Armas & Rehfeldt, 2015
Burmezomus Bastawade, 2004
Calima Moreno-González & Villarreal, 2012
Cangozomus Pinto-da-Rocha, Andrade, R. & Moreno-González, 2016
Caribezomus Armas, 2011
Clavizomus Reddell & Cokendolpher, 1995
Cokendolpherius Armas, 2002
Colombiazomus Armas & Delgado-Santa, 2012
Cubacanthozomus Teruel, 2007
Cubazomus Reddell & Cokendolpher, 1995
Draculoides Harvey, 1992
Dumitrescoella Teruel, 2017
Enigmazomus Harvey, 2006
Gravelyzomus Kulkarni, 2012
Guanazomus Teruel & Armas, 2002
Hansenochrus Reddell & Cokendolpher, 1995
Harveyus Monjaraz-Ruedas, Prendini & Francke, 2019
Heterocubazomus Teruel, 2007
Heteroschizomus Rowland, 1973
Hubbardia Cook, 1899
Javazomus Reddell & Cokendolpher, 1995
Julattenius Harvey, 1992
Kenyazomus Armas, 2014
Lawrencezomus Armas, 2014
Luisarmasius Reddell & Cokendolpher, 1995
Mahezomus Harvey, 2001
Mayazomus Reddell & Cokendolpher, 1995
Megaschizomus Lawrence, 1969
Naderiore Pinto-da-Rocha, Andrade, R. & Moreno-González, 2016
Nahual Monjaraz-Ruedas, Prendini & Francke, 2019
Neozomus Reddell & Cokendolpher, 1995
Notozomus Harvey, 1992
Oculozomus Reddell & Cokendolpher, 1995
Olmecazomus Monjaraz-Ruedas, Prendini & Francke, 2017
Orientzomus Cokendolpher & Tsurusaki, 1994
Ovozomus Harvey, 2001
Pacal Reddell & Cokendolpher, 1995
Paradraculoides Harvey, Berry, Edward & Humphreys, 2008
Piaroa Villarreal, Giupponi & Tourinho, 2008
Reddellzomus Armas, 2002
Rowlandius Reddell & Cokendolpher, 1995
Schizomus Cook, 1899
Schizophyxia Monjaraz-Ruedas, Prendini & Francke, 2019
Secozomus Harvey, 2001
Siguanesiotes Teruel, 2018
Sotanostenochrus Reddell & Cokendolpher, 1991
Stenochrus Chamberlin, 1922
Stenoschizomus González-Sponga, 1997
Stewartpeckius Reddell & Cokendolpher, 1995
Surazomus Reddell & Cokendolpher, 1995
Tayos Reddell & Cokendolpher, 1995
Trithyreus Kraepelin, 1899
Troglocubazomus Teruel, 2003
Troglostenochrus Monjaraz-Ruedas, Prendini & Francke, 2019
Vinabayesius Teruel & Rodriguez-Cabrera, 2021
Wayuuzomus Armas & Colmenares, 2006
Zomus Reddell & Cokendolpher, 1995
†Annazomus De Francesco Magnussen & Müller, 2022
†Calcoschizomus Pierce, 1951
†Cretaceozomus De Francesco Magnussen & Müller, 2022
†Groehnizomus De Francesco Magnussen & Müller, 2022
†Mesozomus Müller, Dunlop, Kotthoff, Hammel & Harms, 2019
†Muellerizomus De Francesco Magnussen & Müller, 2022
†Onychothelyphonus Pierce, 1950

Notes

References

External links

Arachnid families
Schizomida